Gaston Godel (19 August 1914 in Givisiez − 17 February 2004 in Domdidier) was a Swiss race walker.

References

1914 births
2004 deaths
Swiss male racewalkers
Athletes (track and field) at the 1948 Summer Olympics
Olympic athletes of Switzerland
Olympic silver medalists for Switzerland
Medalists at the 1948 Summer Olympics
Olympic silver medalists in athletics (track and field)
Sportspeople from the canton of Fribourg